Sophie Berge (born 5 July 1964) is a French yacht racer who competed in the 1988 Summer Olympics.

References

External links
 
 
 

1964 births
Living people
French female sailors (sport)
Olympic sailors of France
Sailors at the 1988 Summer Olympics – 470
Place of birth missing (living people)